Elvira Lobato is a Brazilian journalist. She has worked at Folha de S.Paulo for 25 out of 39 years in which she was a journalist; she retired in 2012. She was awarded some of the most prestigious prizes for journalists in Brazil, including Prêmio Esso, that she received in 2008 for an investigative series on the wealth of Igreja Universal. Because of this work, she has been threatened and publicly persecuted.

Awards 
 Congresso Internacional de Jornalismo Investigativo, 2016
 Troféu Mulher Imprensa, category "Repórter de site de notícias", 2012
 Prêmio Esso de Jornalismo, for "Universal chega aos 30 anos com império empresarial", Folha de S.Paulo, 2008
 Prêmio CNT de Jornalismo, for "Vícios de Gestão Afundaram Varig", Folha de S.Paulo, 2006
 Prêmio Imprensa Embratel, for "Teles negociam compra da Embratel para subir preços", Folha de S.Paulo, 2004
 Grande Prêmio Folha de Jornalismo, 1999 and 2004

References 

Year of birth missing (living people)
Living people
Brazilian journalists